Idrettsklubben Junkeren ("Junkeren" means "The Junker") is a Norwegian sports club from Bodø, Nordland. It has sections for association football and team handball.

The women's handball team played in the highest Norwegian league in the 1990s.

The men's football team currently plays in the Norwegian Second Division, the third tier of the Norwegian football league system. The club has played in the Norwegian Third Division from 2004 to 2006 and from 2011 to 2022.

Recent history
{|class="wikitable"
|-bgcolor="#efefef"
! Season
!
! Pos.
! Pl.
! W
! D
! L
! GS
! GA
! P
!Cup
!Notes
|-
|2005
|3. divisjon
|align=right |6
|align=right|20||align=right|8||align=right|2||align=right|10
|align=right|41||align=right|59||align=right|26
|1st qualifying round 
|
|-
|2006
|3. divisjon
|align=right bgcolor="#FFCCCC"| 11
|align=right|22||align=right|5||align=right|2||align=right|15
|align=right|44||align=right|90||align=right|17
|1st qualifying round 
|Relegated to 4. divisjon
|-
|2007
|4. divisjon
|align=right |8
|align=right|14||align=right|2||align=right|1||align=right|11
|align=right|28||align=right|54||align=right|7
|Not Qualified
|
|-
|2008
|4. divisjon
|align=right |8
|align=right|16||align=right|3||align=right|2||align=right|11
|align=right|40||align=right|50||align=right|11
|Not Qualified
|
|-
|2009
|4. divisjon
|align=right |3
|align=right|16||align=right|9||align=right|2||align=right|5
|align=right|69||align=right|32||align=right|26
|Not Qualified
|
|-
|2010
|4. divisjon
|align=right bgcolor=#DDFFDD| 1
|align=right|18||align=right|16||align=right|1||align=right|1
|align=right|93||align=right|27||align=right|49
|Not Qualified 
|Promoted to 3. divisjon
|-
|2011
|3. divisjon
|align=right |12
|align=right|22||align=right|3||align=right|2||align=right|17
|align=right|22||align=right|73||align=right|11
|2nd qualifying round 
|
|-
|2012
|3. divisjon
|align=right |11
|align=right|22||align=right|5||align=right|3||align=right|14
|align=right|34||align=right|63||align=right|18
|2nd qualifying round 
|
|-
|2013 
|3. divisjon
|align=right |11
|align=right|22||align=right|6||align=right|4||align=right|12
|align=right|36||align=right|57||align=right|22
|1st round 
|
|-
|2014
|3. divisjon
|align=right |3
|align=right|22||align=right|14||align=right|4||align=right|4
|align=right|59||align=right|31||align=right|46
|2nd qualifying round 
|
|-
|2015
|3. divisjon
|align=right |7
|align=right|22||align=right|11||align=right|2||align=right|9
|align=right|47||align=right|43||align=right|35
|2nd qualifying round 
|
|-
|2016
|3. divisjon
|align=right |2
|align=right|22||align=right|13||align=right|5||align=right|4
|align=right|49||align=right|36||align=right|44
|1st round 
|
|-
|2017 
|3. divisjon
|align=right |4
|align=right|26||align=right|11||align=right|6||align=right|9
|align=right|61||align=right|59||align=right|39
|2nd qualifying round 
|
|-
|2018 
|3. divisjon
|align=right |5
|align=right|26||align=right|13||align=right|7||align=right|6
|align=right|76||align=right|42||align=right|46
|2nd round 
|
|-
|2019 
|3. divisjon 
|align=right |7
|align=right|26||align=right|12||align=right|3||align=right|11
|align=right|69||align=right|56||align=right|39
|1st round 
|
|-
|2020
|colspan="11"|Season cancelled
|-
|2021 
|3. divisjon 
|align=right |3
|align=right|13||align=right|6||align=right|4||align=right|3
|align=right|33||align=right|22||align=right|22
|2nd round 
|
|-
|2022
|3. divisjon
|align=right bgcolor=#DDFFDD| 1
|align=right|26||align=right|23||align=right|3||align=right|0
|align=right|86||align=right|24||align=right|72
|2nd round
|Promoted to 2. divisjon
|}
Source:

References

External links
Official site

Football clubs in Norway
Sport in Bodø
Association football clubs established in 1958
Norwegian handball clubs
Multi-sport clubs in Norway